Fever 121614 is a 2015 live album by Deerhoof. It received "generally favorable" reviews, according to review aggregator Metacritic.

References 

2015 live albums
Deerhoof albums